Kevin Aguilar (born September 7, 1988) is an American mixed martial artist (MMA). Aguilar was the Legacy Fighting Alliance (LFA) Featherweight champion and he currently competes in the featherweight division in the Ultimate Fighting Championship (UFC).

Mixed martial arts career

Early career 
Aguilar started his professional MMA career since 2010  and fought under various promoters in the southern region of United States. He amassed a record of 15-1 and won the Legacy Fighting Alliance Featherweight championship prior participated in Dana White's Tuesday Night Contender Series.

Dana White's Tuesday Night Contender Series 
Aguilar appeared in Dana White's Contender Series 12 web-series program. He faced Joey Gomez  on July 10, 2018 and won the fight via unanimous decision. Even with the win, Aguilar was not offered a contract on show but he was brought in to face Ricky Glenn at The Ultimate Fighter 28 Finale.

Ultimate Fighting Championship
Aguilar made his UFC debut on November 30, 2018, replacing an injured Arnold Allen, at The Ultimate Fighter 28 Finale against Ricky Glenn. At the weigh-ins, Glenn weighed in at 148.5 pounds, 2.5 pounds over the featherweight non-title fight limit of 146. He was fined 20 percent of his purse, which went to Aguilar. The bout proceeded at a catchweight. Aguilar won the fight via unanimous decision.
 
His next fight came on March 30, 2019 at UFC on ESPN 2 against Enrique Barzola. He won the fight via unanimous decision.

Aguilar faced Dan Ige on June 22, 2019 at UFC Fight Night 154 He lost the fight via unanimous decision.

Aguilar faced Zubaira Tukhugov on February 23, 2020 at UFC Fight Night 168. He lost the fight via TKO in the first round.

Aguilar faced Charles Rosa on June 13, 2020 at UFC on ESPN: Eye vs. Calvillo. He lost the fight via split decision.

Aguilar faced Tucker Lutz at UFC 262 on May 15, 2021. He lost the bout via unanimous decision.

Championships and accomplishments
Legacy Fighting Alliance
Legacy Fighting Alliance Featherweight Champion (Two times)

Mixed martial arts record

|Loss
|align=center|17–5
|Tucker Lutz
|Decision (unanimous)
|UFC 262
|
|align=center|3
|align=center|5:00
|Houston, Texas, United States
|
|-
|Loss
|align=center|17–4
|Charles Rosa
|Decision (split)
|UFC on ESPN: Eye vs. Calvillo
|
|align=center|3
|align=center|5:00
|Las Vegas, Nevada, United States
|
|-
|Loss
|align=center|17–3
|Zubaira Tukhugov
|TKO (punches)
|UFC Fight Night: Felder vs. Hooker
|
|align=center|1
|align=center|3:21
|Auckland, New Zealand
|
|-
|Loss
|align=center|17–2
|Dan Ige
|Decision (unanimous)
|UFC Fight Night: Moicano vs. The Korean Zombie
|
|align=center|3
|align=center|5:00
|Greenville, South Carolina, United States
|
|-
|Win
|align=center|17–1
|Enrique Barzola
|Decision (unanimous)
|UFC on ESPN: Barboza vs. Gaethje
|
|align=center|3
|align=center|5:00
|Philadelphia, Pennsylvania, United States
|
|-
|Win
|align=center|16–1
|Ricky Glenn
|Decision (unanimous)
|The Ultimate Fighter: Heavy Hitters Finale
|
|align=center|3
|align=center|5:00
|Las Vegas, Nevada, United States
|
|-
|Win
|align=center|15–1
|Joey Gomez
|Decision (split)
|Dana White's Contender Series 12
|
|align=center|3
|align=center|5:00
|Las Vegas, Nevada, United States
|
|-
|Win
|align=center|14–1
|Thanh Le 
|KO (punches)
|LFA 40
|
|align=center|1
|align=center|2:44
|Dallas, Texas, United States
|
|-
|Win
|align=center|13–1
|Justin Rader
|Decision (unanimous)
|LFA 18
|
|align=center|5
|align=center|5:00
|Shawnee, Oklahoma, United States
|
|-
|Win
|align=center|12–1
|Damon Jackson
|KO (punches)
|LFA 4
|
|align=center|3
|align=center|4:05
|Bossier City, Louisiana, United States
|
|-
|Win
|align=center|11–1
|Tony Kelley
|Decision (split)
|Legacy FC 57
|
|align=center|5
|align=center|5:00
|Bossier City, Louisiana, United States
|
|-
|Win
|align=center|10–1
|David Bosnick
|TKO (submission to punches)
|Legacy FC 49
|
|align=center|2
|align=center|2:04
|Bossier City, Louisiana, United States
|
|-
|Win
|align=center|9–1
|Alex Black
|TKO (punches)
|Legacy FC 39
|
|align=center|3
|align=center|3:13
|Houston, Texas, United States
|
|-
|Loss
|align=center|8–1
|Leonard Garcia
|TKO (punches)
|Legacy FC 26
|
|align=center|1
|align=center|2:57
|San Antonio, Texas, United States
|
|-
|Win
|align=center|8–0
|Hunter Tucker
|Submission (ambar)
|Legacy FC 19
|
|align=center|1
|align=center|2:24
|Dallas, Texas, United States
|
|-
|Win
|align=center|7–0
|Nick Gonzalez
|Decision (unanimous)
|Legacy FC 17
|
|align=center|3
|align=center|5:00
|San Antonio, Texas, United States
|
|-
|Win
|align=center|6–0
|Calvin Miller
|TKO (punches)
|Ascend Combat: Mayhem 2
|
|align=center|3
|align=center|4:26
|Shreveport, Louisiana, United States
|
|-
|Win
|align=center|5–0
|Rey Trujillo
|TKO (punches from top-side triangle)
|Ascend Combat: Nothing Personal
|
|align=center|2
|align=center|3:45
|Shreveport, Louisiana, United States
|
|-
|Win
|align=center|4–0
|Nate Murdock
|TKO (punches)
|Xtreme Fight Night 5
|
|align=center|3
|align=center|1:16
|Tulsa, Oklahoma, United States
|
|-
|Win
|align=center|3–0
|Ronald Jacobs
|TKO (punches)
|FLABBP Round 3: Night of Champions
|
|align=center|2
|align=center|2:35
|Gonzales, Louisiana, United States
|
|-
|Win
|align=center|2–0
|Matt Hunt
|TKO (punches)
|Bellator 36
|
|align=center|1
|align=center|3:02
|Shreveport, Louisiana, United States
|
|-
|Win
|align=center|1–0
|Chris Shumake
|TKO (punches)
|Ascend Combat: Season's Beatings 2
|
|align=center|1
|align=center|3:28
|Shreveport, Louisiana, United States
|
|-

See also
List of current UFC fighters
List of male mixed martial artists

References

External links
  
 

1988 births
Featherweight mixed martial artists
Mixed martial artists utilizing Brazilian jiu-jitsu
Living people
American male mixed martial artists
American practitioners of Brazilian jiu-jitsu
Ultimate Fighting Championship male fighters